Călugăru may refer to several entities in Romania:

 Călugăru, a village in Botoroaga Commune, Teleorman County
Alice Călugăru
Ion Călugăru
Călugăru River
Călugăru Mic River

Romanian-language surnames